Minuscule 15 (in the Gregory-Aland numbering), ε 283 (von Soden). It is a Greek minuscule manuscript of the New Testament, on 225 parchment leaves, dated palaeographically to the 12th-century. It has liturgical books and full marginalia.

Description 

The codex contains a complete text of the four Gospels. It contains also liturgical books with hagiographies: synaxarion and Menologion.

The biblical text is written in one column per page, 23-24 lines per page. It was written in neat, and regular letters.

The first three pages are written in gold, with exquisite miniatures, four on page 2, four on page 3.

It has iota adscriptum.

There is also a division according to the Ammonian Sections, with references to the Eusebian Canons (written below Ammonian Section numbers).

Text 

The Greek text of the codex is a representative of the Byzantine text-type. Hermann von Soden classified it to Ak (the Byzantine commentated text). Aland placed it in Category V.
According to the Claremont Profile Method it belongs to the textual family Kx in Luke 1 and Luke 20. In Luke 10 no profile was made.

At the margin of Mark 16:8 it has questionable scholion: εν τισι των αντιγραφων, εως ωδε πληρουται ο ευαγγελιστης εν πολλοις δε, και ταυτα φερεται.

The text of the pericope John 7:53-8:11 is omitted.

History 
Scholz dated it to the 10th-century, Gregory to the 12th-century. Currently it is dated by the INTF to the 12th-century.

The manuscript was brought to Paris by Catherine de' Medici. It was in private hands, and became one of the manuscripts used by Kuster's in his revised reprint of Mill's Novum Testamentum Graecum (Paris 8). 
Scholz examined a bigger part of Matthew, Mark and John in the codex. It was examined and described by Burgon and Paulin Martin. C. R. Gregory saw the manuscript in 1884.

The codex is located now at the Bibliothèque nationale de France (Gr. 64) in Paris.

See also 
 List of New Testament minuscules
 Textual criticism

References

Further reading 

 

Greek New Testament minuscules
12th-century biblical manuscripts
Bibliothèque nationale de France collections